Scarecrow is an American heavy metal band from New York City, formed in 1989. The band was founded by John Blaze and former Twisted Sister guitarist Eddie Ojeda and enjoyed limited success in the USA during the explosion of hair metal in the late '80s. Scarecrow released five studio albums to date.

Discography

Albums 
 Scarecrow (1992)
 A Touch of Madness (1995)
 Sins of a Scarecrow (1999)
 Blood, Sweat and 20 Years (2012)
 I Am Scarecrow (2014)

References

External links
 Scarecrow Official Website
 Scarecrow Discography
 Scarecrow "Welcome To My Mind" Official Video

Heavy metal musical groups from New York (state)
Musical groups established in 1989